John T. Bunyan (September 7, 1905 – September 30, 1989) was an American football player. He played college football for NYU and in the National Football League (NFL) as a guard and center for the Staten Island Stapletons (1929-1930, 1932) and Brooklyn Dodgers (1932). He appeared in 23 NFL games, 20 as a starter.

References

1905 births
1989 deaths
Staten Island Stapletons players
Brooklyn Dodgers (NFL) players
Players of American football from Hartford, Connecticut
NYU Violets football players
American football centers
American football guards